The Personal Flight Sky-Tender is an American ultralight trike flying boat that was designed and produced by Personal Flight of Chelan, Washington. Production is complete and the aircraft is no longer available.

Design and development
It features a cable-braced hang glider-style high-wing, weight-shift controls, a two-seats-in-tandem, open cockpit, a hull made from an inflatable boat and a single engine in pusher configuration.

The aircraft is made from bolted-together aluminum tubing, with its large area  single surface wing covered in Dacron sailcloth. Its  span wing is supported by a single tube-type kingpost and uses an "A" frame control bar. An off-the-shelf commercial inflatable boat hull is used. A water rudder is fitted at the rear of the boat hull.

The large wing area was employed to keep the stall speed low to avoid porpoising problems while conducting water operations. The weight shift nature of the wing means that hull pitch angle cannot be controlled and loss of control is a risk when higher take-off and landing speeds are required.

The Sky-Tender was assembled in the United States by Personal Flight from aircraft and marine components from Italy, France and Austria. The price in 2000 was US$20,000.

Specifications (Sky-Tender)

References

Sky-Tender
1990s United States ultralight aircraft
Single-engined pusher aircraft
Ultralight trikes